Five Eight is a band from Athens, Georgia, USA.

Since 1992, Five Eight has recorded eight Compact Discs. They previously toured with R.E.M. and have performed with Cheap Trick, The Ramones, Cracker, Pylon, and Seven Mary Three. The group is prominent in the Athens/Atlanta area and has played at Athens Recovery Fest.  The band came together in 1988 in Athens when an earlier incarnation, known as The Reasonable Men, disbanded.  Before settling on the name Five Eight, they played at least one show under the name The Helgrammites.

The ninth Five Eight offering, titled "Your God Is Dead To Me Now," was recorded in 2010 and released in early 2011. Sean Dunn rejoined the group for this album. In July 2017, Five Eight released their tenth album, "Songs for St. Jude," a double album on Chicken Ranch Records with appearances by Patterson Hood and Jack Logan.

The band is the subject of the upcoming feature documentary Weirdo: The Story of Five Eight, directed by former journalist Marc Pilvinsky and due in 2020."

Band members
The original three members of the band were Mike Mantione on vocals and guitar, Dan Horowitz on bass guitar, and Mike Palmatier on drums.  In 1989, Palmatier's right leg was crushed in a work-related accident at the Armstrong and Dobbs lumberyard in Athens.  His was temporarily replaced by Patrick Ferguson, the drummer for the LaBrea Stompers and Angle Lake—a band which also included Vic Chesnutt. Palmatier returned to the Boston area. Ferguson rejoined the band and was Five Eight's full-time drummer until 1998. After the release of "I Learned Shut Up," guitarist Sean Dunn joined the band and was a full-time member for the recording of "The Angriest Man" EP.  Between 1992 and 1998, Five Eight toured. extensively as a four-piece in the United States and Canada and played 200 shows or more a year. Ferguson left the band in 1998 and was soon followed by Dunn.  Ferguson was briefly replaced by former Bughummer, Little Red Rocket and The Runs drummer Scott Sosebee. Drummer Mike Rizzi joined Five Eight in 1999 and remained until mid-2007.  The band went on hiatus when Rizzi moved to Southern California to join Ghost Hounds. Ferguson rejoined the band to play "a few shows" near the end of 2007 and is again the full-time drummer for the group.  

 Mike Mantione (singer/songwriter/guitar)
 Dan Horowitz (bass)
 Patrick "Tigger" Ferguson (drums)
 Sean Dunn (guitar)

Discography
 1989 'Passive-Aggressive'
    * you never look in my eyes
    * the ape
    * she was in this city
    * she's dropping the bomb
    * ghost in this town
    * ralph newman
    * lemon love drops
    * lifer
    * looking up
 1991 'Inflatable Sense of Self'
    * missing link
    * my sister is so strange
    * the ape
    * she's dropping the bomb
    * suit of sin
    * nowhere in a circle
    * ralph newman
    * shaking through the night
    * the only one
    * looking up
 1992 'I Learned Shut Up'
    * looking up
    * god damn it paul
    * missing link
    * i can't stand it
    * she's dropping the bomb
    * desperate tonight
    * lemon love drops
    * suit of sin
    * the ape
    * dawn of son melody
    * destroy this world
 1993 'The Angriest Man' EP
    * my syster
    * not zeppelin
    * ralph newman
    * lifer
    * depressed
    * needle
    * pent up
 1994 'Weirdo'
    * mystery james
    * karaoke
    * behead myself
    * fall asleep
    * what they did
    * you never look in my eyes
    * stars
    * tense it up
    * hurt you
    * weirdo
    * shouldn't be here
 1997 'Gasolina'
    * stanley
    * engine
    * comet
    * shaken
    * shut me off
    * connect the dots
    * doubter
    * hold me up
    * right to drive
    * summer vacation
    * dumb ass
    * take aim
 2000 'The Good Nurse'
    * she's sleeping
    * rose's dream
    * off season
    * the one who does better
    * terminals
    * requiem
    * take what you want
    * alexander graham bell
    * oh surgery
    * all my patients
    * orlando
    * a close approximation
    * florence
 2004 'Five Eight'
    * criminal
    * i'm still around
    * magnetic fields
    * the liquor
    * square peg
    * do it anyway
    * i don't give a damn
    * bad juices
    * guitar
    * lousy decision
    * a man is a pent up thing
    * bad for us
 2010 'Your God Is Dead To Me Now' 
    * sad eyes
    * your god is dead to me now
    * motorcycle
    * the ballad of frankie, jr
    * next to nothing
    * fire of love
    * i'm a wreck
    * staring contest
    * mom's best boy
    * a son like you
    * ode to massachusetts
    * scout knot
    * get out of my head
    * what can one man change?
 2017 'Songs For St. Jude' 
    * Smoke
   * Pleiades
   * You Know Me Too Well
   * Palace Estates
   * Song for Jim Gordon
   * The Hollow
   * Tatoos and Tequila
   * Werner Herzog
   * Sherman Oaks Fire
   * Iron On Sun
   * Someday
   * The Flood
   * Tall Tales
   * Kids
   * Florida
   * Huckleberry Inn
   * Once on the Lam

References

 The Post and Courier – Google News Archive Search
 Five-eight Is Not Just A Scream - Chicago Tribune
 The Albany Herald – Google News Archive Search
 Gainesville Sun – Google News Archive Search
 Five Eight releases self-titled album.(The Orlando Sentinel) - Knight Ridder/Tribune News Service | HighBeam Research 
 Five-Eight out to prove it's more than a scream 
 Archives - OrlandoSentinel.com 
 Nearing 30, Five Eight Doesn't Sweat the Missed Opportunities - Flagpole Magazine http://flagpole.com/music/music-features/2017/07/19/nearing-30-five-eight-doesn-t-sweat-the-missed-opportunities

External links
 

Musical groups from Athens, Georgia